Acacia squamata is a shrub of the genus Acacia and the subgenus Phyllodineae that is endemic to south western Australia.

Description
It is usually has maulitple glabrous stems and is occasionally rhizomatous. The flexible, green to grey green cylindrical stems have barely visible nerves. Like most species of Acacia it has phyllodes rather than true leaves. It blooms from July to September and produces yellow flowers. The simple inflorescences occur in pairs of groups of four an short racemes. The spherical flower-heads contain 6 to 11 golden coloured flowers.

Taxonomy
The type specimen was collected by James Drummond in 1839.

Description
It is native to an area in the  Wheatbelt, Great Southern and South West regions of Western Australia where it mostly grows in gravelly lateritic soils. The bulk of the population is found from around Bindoon in the north west down to around Mount Barker extending to around Fitzgerald River National Park in the south east and up to around Newdegate in the north east growing in a variety of habitats in sandy to loamy laterite based soils as a part of Eucalyptus woodland, heath or scrubland communities.

See also
List of Acacia species

References

squamata
Acacias of Western Australia
Taxa named by John Lindley